The 1956 Temple Owls football team was an American football team that represented Temple University as an independent during the 1956 NCAA College Division football season. In its first season under head coach Peter P. Stevens, the team compiled a 3–5 record. The team played its home games at Temple Stadium in Philadelphia.

Schedule

References

Temple
Temple Owls football seasons
Temple Owls football